Chen Xu (born November 1952) is a former Chinese prosecutor who served as the Prosecutor General of Shanghai People's Procuratorate from 2008 to 2016. He was investigated in March 2017 by the Communist Party's anti-graft agency, suspected of corruption.

Career
Chen was born in Shanghai in November 1952. In 1979, he became the Clerk of Shanghai Intermediate People's Court, then promoted to Vice President. He became the Vice President of Shanghai Supreme People's Court in 1995, then became the President of Shanghai 1st Intermediate People's Court in 1998. In 2002, Chen became the Deputy Secretary of the Political and Legal Affairs Commission of Shanghai, and the Prosecutor General of Shanghai People's Procuratorate in 2008.

In 2016, he is no longer served as the Prosecutor General of Shanghai People's Procuratorate for retirement, and he became the President of Shanghai Law Society.

Downfall
On March 1, 2017, Chen Xu was suspected of "serious violations of party discipline", and placed under investigation by the Central Commission for Discipline Inspection (CCDI). Chen was expelled from the Communist Party on May 25, 2017.

On October 25, 2018, Chen was sentenced to life in prison for taking bribes worth 74.23 million yuan in Nanning.

In June 2022, his successor Zhang Bencai was also put under investigation for alleged "serious violations of discipline and laws".

References

1952 births
Living people
People's Republic of China politicians from Shanghai
Chinese Communist Party politicians from Shanghai
Expelled members of the Chinese Communist Party